Dr. Yashwant Singh Parmar Government Medical College Nahan is medical college located in Nahan, Sirmaur district of Himachal Pradesh.

References

Medical colleges in Himachal Pradesh
Education in Sirmaur district
Educational institutions established in 2016
2016 establishments in Himachal Pradesh